Eunidia ziczac is a species of beetle in the family Cerambycidae. It was described by Stephan von Breuning in 1939. It is known from South Africa, Malawi, and Zimbabwe.

It's 4.5 mm long and 1 mm wide, and its type locality is "Natal". It is named for the zig-zag pattern on its elytron.

References

Eunidiini
Beetles described in 1939
Taxa named by Stephan von Breuning (entomologist)